Takapsestis wilemaniella is a moth in the family Drepanidae. It was described by Shōnen Matsumura in 1933. It is found in Nepal, Taiwan, Vietnam and Fujian, China.

Subspecies
Takapsestis wilemaniella wilemaniella (Taiwan)
Takapsestis wilemaniella continentalis Laszlo, Ronkay & Ronkay, 2001 (Vietnam, China: Fujian)
Takapsestis wilemaniella plumbeata László, Ronkay & Ronkay, 2001 (Nepal)

References

Moths described in 1933
Thyatirinae
Moths of Asia